Tevita Wanono Tawai (born ) is a Fijian male weightlifter, competing in the 77 kg category and representing Fiji at international competitions. He won the bronze medal at the 2015 Pacific Games lifting a total of 267 kg. He participated at the 2014 Commonwealth Games in the 77 kg event.

Major competitions

References

1992 births
Living people
Fijian male weightlifters
Place of birth missing (living people)
Weightlifters at the 2014 Commonwealth Games
Commonwealth Games competitors for Fiji